

bluemouth inc. is an experimental theater company known for creating immersive performance works. It holds split residence in New York City, Toronto, and Montreal and is an intersection of dance,  performance art,  visual  media,  electronic  music,  lyric poetry, and psychological realism. Collaborative and interdisciplinary in its approach, its hosts traditional theatrical and event-based performative productions.

History 
The company started in 1998, with the presentation of their first work, Mapping Currents, which was presented as part of Edgy Women Festival in Montreal. In 2000, the company relocated from Montreal to Toronto, the same year the collective of artists officially incorporated the company.

In 2002, the company started work on a new project called Something About a River which took place at three locations along the buried Garrison Creek in Toronto. This work was eventually presented as a complete five-hour performance entitled Something About a River and was nominated for six Dora Mavor Moore Awards. It received the award for ‘Outstanding Independent Production’.

The Memory of Bombs was developed the following year through a residency at the Theatre Centre in Toronto and workshopped at the 2004 Summerworks Theatre Festival. This project was then revised and presented under its new title – How Soon is Now – the following year during the Theatre Centre's site-specific season. It was subsequently nominated for five Dora awards.
At the same time, the company began disseminating its work internationally by remounting a number of projects in New York City. From 2005-2009 the company remounted Lenz, What the Thunder Said, American Standard, Death by Water, and How Soon is Now.

In 2008, the company was awarded a Fresh Ground New Works commission from Harbourfront Centre for the creation of Dance Marathon, a duration-based immersive performance inspired by the dance marathons of the Great Depression. This piece was developed in Toronto and at Montreal's Place Des Arts and premiered at Harbourfront's World Stage Festival in February 2009.

Dance Marathon has been presented by The Cork MidSummer Festival, Ireland (2009), the Winter Olympics in Vancouver (2010), APAP Festival, New York City (2010), Dance Massive, Melbourne & Ten Days on the Island, Tasmania (2011), The Edinburgh Festival Fringe, The Traverse Theatre, Scotland (2011), Dance Umbrella, BITE Barbican Centre, London (2011),  World Stage, Harbourfront Centre, Toronto (remount 2012), Norwich Norfolk Festival, Norfolk-Norwich, UK (2013), Magnetic North Festival, Halifax, Canada (2014), Mayfest, in Bristol, UK (2015) and the fabrik Festival, in Potsdam, Germany (2015).

Founding members
 Ciara Adams
 Stephen O’Connell
 Sabrina Reeves
 Lucy Simic
 Richard Windeyer

Awards and honors
bluemouth inc. has been nominated for 13 Dora Mavor Moore awards, and won 2, the first was in the category "Outstanding Independent Play" for Something About a River (2004), and second was for "Outstanding lighting design" by Patrick Lavender, for It Comes in Waves (2016).

References
Notes

Further reading
 Barton, Bruce. “Coherent Confusion and Intentional Accidents: bluemouth inc.'s Dance Marathon”, Forum (2011)
 Barton, Bruce. “Subjectivity culture communications intermedia: A Meditation on the "Impure Interactions" of Performance and the "In-Between" Space of Intimacy in a Wired World”, Theatre Research in Canada, Vol. 29, No. 1 (2008)

External links

 

Experimental theatre